The Day the Rains Came is a 1959 West German crime film directed by Gerd Oswald and starring Mario Adorf, Christian Wolff, Gert Fröbe and Elke Sommer. It is named after song "Am Tag als der Regen kam" by Dalida, which was a big hit of the year; then it was customary to release a film named after the hit songs of the moment.

The film's sets were designed by the art director Paul Markwitz and Hans Jürgen Kiebach. It was shot at the Bavaria Studios in Munich and on location in West Berlin.

Cast
 Mario Adorf as Werner Maurer
 Christian Wolff  as Robert
 Gert Fröbe as Dr. Albert Maurer
 Corny Collins as Inge Zimmermann
 Elke Sommer as Ellen
 Claus Wilcke as Rudi
 Ernst Jacobi as Fritz
 Gert Günther Hoffmann as Willi
 Wolf Richards as Otto
 Uwe Gauditz as Professor
 Horst Naumann as Kriminalassistent Thiel
 Ulla Moritz as Bardame im Splendid
 Harry Hertzsch
 Arno Paulsen as Textilkaufmann Grossmann
 Herbert Weissbach as Rummelplatzpächter Streichan

References

Bibliography
 Spicer, Andrew. Historical Dictionary of Film Noir. Scarecrow Press, 2010.

External links 
 

1959 films
1959 crime films
German crime films
West German films
1950s German-language films
Films directed by Gerd Oswald
Films shot at Bavaria Studios
Bavaria Film films
Films shot in Berlin
1950s German films